Orlin Aleksandrov Goranov is a Bulgarian pop singer.

Biography 
Orlin Goranov was born on 8 August 1957 in Berkovitsa, Bulgaria.

Personal life 
Goranov is married to his former girlfriend, Vanya. They have a daughter, Zhaki.

Career

Music career 
Goranov started his career as a singer in the Bulgarian choir "Бодра смяна".

Movie career 
Goranov appeared in the Bulgarian movie Mission London.

Since 7 September 2020 he's host of the Bulgarian TV show Последният печели (Posledniyat pecheli, in ), which airs on BNT 1.

Albums 
 Към една жена (To a woman) (1983)
 Orlin Goranov (1985)
 Ти и аз (You and me) (2000), with Kristina Dimitrova

Awards 
 Youth Pop Song Competition, Sofia in 1978 – first place
 Schlager Festival in Dresden in 1981 – first place
 Intertalant in 1981, Prague – third place
 Golden Orpheus, Bulgaria 1984 – first place

References 

 Biography of Orlin Goranov
 Discography of Orlin Goranov

20th-century Bulgarian male singers
Bulgarian pop singers
Living people
1957 births